Radman may refer to:

 RaD Man, pseudonym of Christian Wirth, American computer artist and historian
 Radman, Yemen, village in San‘a’ Governorate
 Miroslav Radman (born 1944), Croatian biologist
 Velimir Radman (born 1983), Croatian footballer
 Gordan Grlić-Radman, Croatian foreign minister

See also 
 Radmanović,  Serbo-Croatian surname:

Croatian surnames